Hon. George Henry Compton Cavendish (14 October 1784 – 22 January 1809) was an English Whig politician and British Army officer, the son of Lord George Cavendish, later Earl of Burlington. He was educated at Eton College.

He was commissioned Cornet in the 7th Dragoons in 1801, and subsequently promoted Lieutenant in 1802, Captain in 1804, and Major in 1808, when in the latter year he joined his regiment serving in the Peninsular War. He was evacuated from Corunna but was drowned at the age of 24 when his transport ship, sank in a storm off the Cornwall coast in January 1809 on arrival in British waters.

He served as MP for the borough of Aylesbury from 1806 until his death in 1809, predeceasing his father.

References

External links 
 

1784 births
1809 deaths
People educated at Eton College
Members of the Parliament of the United Kingdom for English constituencies
UK MPs 1802–1806
UK MPs 1806–1807
UK MPs 1807–1812
George Henry Compton Cavendish
Younger sons of earls